Knud Oluf Jessen Degn (11 May 1880 – 16 May 1965) was a Danish sailor who competed in the 1924 Summer Olympics. In 1924 he won the silver medal as crew member of the Danish boat Bonzo in the 6 metre class event.

References

External links
 
 
 

1880 births
1965 deaths
Danish male sailors (sport)
Olympic sailors of Denmark
Sailors at the 1924 Summer Olympics – 6 Metre
Olympic silver medalists for Denmark
Olympic medalists in sailing
Medalists at the 1924 Summer Olympics